Mukesh Rawal (1951 – 15 November 2016) was an Indian actor. He worked in Hindi and Gujarati films and television shows. He was well known for playing Vibhishana in Ramanand Sagar's 1987 epic TV series Ramayan.

Personal life 
Mukesh Rawal was born in 1951 in Mumbai, India. His daughters Arya Rawal and Vipra Rawal are television actresses.

Career 
Rawal gained popularity for playing Vibhishana in the 1987 epic TV series Ramayan, created by Ramanand Sagar. He also acted in TV shows like Aaha, Hasratein, Kohi Apna Sa and Beend Banoonga aur Ghodi Chadoonga. He had acted in several Hindi films such as Zid (1994), Yeh Majhdhaar (1996), Lahoo Ke Do Rang (1997), Satta (2003), Auzaar (1997), Mrityudata (1997) and Kasak (2005). 

Rawal was also a prolific actor in Gujarati film industry and theatre. His last Gujarati film was Sathiyo Chalyo Khodaldham (2014). He last acted in Gujarati TV serial Nass Nass Mei Khunnas (2016).

Death 
Rawal died in a train accident on 15 November 2016 in Kandivali, Mumbai, India.

Filmography
 Woh Phir Aayegi (1988)
 Gunahon Ke Shatranj (1988)
 Parki Jani (1991)
 Gruhparvesh (1992)
 Zid (1994)
 Krantiveer (1994)
 Cheetah (1994)
 Yeh Majhdhaar (1996)
 Shastra (1996)
 Auzaar (1997)
 Lahoo Ke Do Rang (1997)
 Mrityudaata (1997)
 Aahaa (1997)
 Vishwavidhaata (1997)
 Kohram (1999)
 Satta (2003)
 Kasak (2005)
 Wake Up Sid (2009)
 Haunted - 3D (2011)
 House For Sale - Short Film (2012)
 Sathiyo Chalyo Khodaldham (2014)

Television
 Jeevan Mrityu (Gujarati) (1990s)
 Ramayana (1987-1988)
 Luv Kush (1988-1989)
 Hasratein (1996-1999) 
  CID (1998)
 Kohi Apna Sa (2001-2003)
 Ssshhhh... Koi Hai (2001-2004)
 Sambhav Asambhav(2003)
 Kabhi Saas Kabhi Bahu(2008-2010)
 Beend Banoongaa Ghodi Chadhaunga (2011-2012)
 Nass Nass Mei Khunnas (2016)

References

External links

2016 deaths
Indian male film actors
21st-century Indian male actors
20th-century Indian male actors
Male actors in Gujarati-language films
1951 births
Indian male television actors
Railway accident deaths in India